Rikus Pretorius (born ) is a South African rugby union player for  in the Currie Cup. His regular position is centre.

References

South African rugby union players
Living people
1999 births
Rugby union centres
South Africa Under-20 international rugby union players
Western Province (rugby union) players
Stormers players
Kubota Spears Funabashi Tokyo Bay players